Red Sun is a 1971 Franco-Italian international co-production Spaghetti Western film directed by Terence Young and starring Charles Bronson, Toshirō Mifune, Alain Delon, Ursula Andress, and Capucine. It was filmed in Spain by the British director Young, with a screenplay by Denne Bart Petitclerc, William Roberts, and Lawrence Roman from a story by Laird Koenig. The film was released in the United States on 9 June 1972.

Plot
Link Stuart and Gauche are ruthless leaders of a gang of bandits who rob a train of its $400,000 payroll. On the train is a Japanese ambassador on his way to Washington, D.C. who has with him a ceremonial tachi sword meant as a gift for the president. Gauche steals the gold-handled tachi and shoots dead one of the ambassador's two samurai. At the same time, by Gauche's order, other members of the gang double-cross Link by throwing dynamite into the train car he is in, leaving him for dead. Before the gang departs, the surviving samurai, Kuroda, tells Gauche he intends to track him down and kill him, but Gauche is dismissive, slightly amused by the threat.

The Japanese ambassador instructs the still alive and unarmed Link, who was not injured in the explosion, to assist Kuroda in tracking down Gauche. Kuroda is given one week to kill Gauche and recover the sword. If he fails, both Kuroda and the ambassador will have to commit harakiri for losing their honor by allowing the tachi to be stolen and leaving the dead samurai unavenged. Link reluctantly agrees, but he realizes that Kuroda will kill Gauche immediately, which Link does not want; he knows Gauche will hide the stolen money somewhere. Once they set off in pursuit of the gang, Link repeatedly attempts to elude Kuroda, only to be thwarted by the irrepressible samurai.

Gauche and four gang members soon bury the money, and then Gauche kills them so only he knows the hiding place. Gauche pays off others, who go their own way, and the remaining gang stay with him. While tracking Gauche's gang, Kuroda reveals that the links to his Samurai values are disappearing and that his countrymen no longer seem to value their ancient culture. Convinced that Japan is changing forever and that its samurai spirit will soon be gone, Kuroda explains that the only way to honor his ancestors and his own way of life is to bring back the tachi sword. The two approach a ranch that has been taken over by some of the gang members; they attack, kill, and steal the gang's horses. Link, now armed with pistols and rifles taken from the gang, can no longer be threatened into doing Kuroda's bidding. He rides away from Kuroda, but has a change of heart and returns, having grown to respect the strict bushido code by which Kuroda lives. He warns Kuroda, however, that he will kill him if he tries to kill Gauche before Link learns where the money is hidden.

Continuing the pursuit, Link decides the best way to get to Gauche is through his lover, Cristina. The duo travel to a familiar brothel in the town of San Lucas where she has a room; after he arrives, Link seals her inside the room so she can't escape. The next morning, four of Gauche's men arrive to fetch Christina. Link and Kuroda kill three of them, and the fourth is sent back to Gauche with the message: the duo has abducted Cristina and will give her to Gauche in exchange for the stolen sword and Link's share of the train robbery spoils. The exchange is to take place at an abandoned mission a day's ride away.

Link and Kuroda, on the way to the exchange, have a nonviolent confrontation that compels Kuroda to agree to not kill Gauche until Link has obtained the needed information. In trying to escape from the duo, Christina rides into the path of a band of Comanche warriors, stabbing and killing the one who assaults her. In retribution, the leader has her bound and her neck tied with wet rawhide, which will slowly strangle her to death as the sun dries out the rawhide strip. Link and Kuroda attack the Comanches, killing many and driving the rest away.

Arriving at the mission, Link and Kuroda are ambushed by Gauche and his men. Gauche, who has the tachi sword with him, tells one of his men to shoot Link, disregarding Cristina's appeal not to do so. Just then, Comanches attack, which forces the ex-partners, Kuroda, Cristina, and Gauche's men to fight on the same side. They successfully repel the attacks, first from inside the mission, then, after it is burned down, in the surrounding cane fields. When the last attack ends and the Comanches are dead or have fled, only Link, Kuroda, Cristina, and Gauche are still alive.

Gauche immediately faces off against Link, who has run out of bullets. Kuroda closes in behind Gauche and prepares to kill him, but hesitates because his oath to Link. Gauche turns and shoots Kuroda, mortally wounding him; Link seizes the opportunity to grab a rifle. Gauche is confident that Link will leave him alive to learn where the money is hidden. Link, however, having decided that the dying samurai's honor is more important than the money, kills him, and promises the dying Kuroda that he will return the tachi to the ambassador. After Kuroda dies and is buried, Link rejects Cristina's offer to join her to track down the money. Before the deadline, he hangs the sword from the telegraph wire in front of the train station, shortly before the Japanese ambassador's train arrives, fulfilling his pledge to the dead samurai.

Cast

Cast notes
Bronson starred in The Magnificent Seven, an American remake of Seven Samurai, in which Mifune had appeared. Film director John Landis has an uncredited appearance as a henchman killed by Mifune's character.

Production
The project was announced in 1968, with Toshirō Mifune attached early on. Ted Richmond Productions was going to make it for Warner Bros.-Seven Arts. Clint Eastwood was mentioned as a possible early co-star. The film was eventually made by France's Corona Films, headed by Robert Dorfman and Richmond.

Bronson was extremely popular in Japanese theaters at this time, and Red Sun set an attendance record in Tokyo, playing for a record 35 weeks in its first run engagements.

References

External links
 
 
 
 

1971 films
1971 Western (genre) films
French Western (genre) films
Spanish Western (genre) films
1970s English-language films
Samurai films
Films directed by Terence Young
Films produced by Robert Dorfmann
Films scored by Maurice Jarre
Films shot in Almería
Italian films about revenge
Spanish films about revenge
French films about revenge
Spaghetti Western films
English-language French films
English-language Italian films
English-language Spanish films
Films with screenplays by William Roberts (screenwriter)
1970s Japanese films
1970s Italian films
1970s French films